Protein-arginine deiminase type-2 is an enzyme that in humans is encoded by the PADI2 gene.

This gene encodes a member of the peptidyl arginine deiminase family of enzymes, which catalyze the post-translational deimination of proteins by converting arginine residues into citrullines in the presence of calcium ions. The family members have distinct substrate specificities and tissue-specific expression patterns. The type II enzyme is the most widely expressed family member. Known substrates for this enzyme include myelin basic protein in the central nervous system and vimentin in skeletal muscle and macrophages. 

This enzyme is thought to play a role in the onset and progression of neurodegenerative human disorders, including Alzheimer disease and multiple sclerosis, and it has also been implicated in glaucoma pathogenesis. This gene exists in a cluster with four other paralogous genes.

References

Further reading